This is a list of extant dukedoms in the nobility of Italy. The Kingdom of Italy was dissolved in 1946 and the use of titles of nobility is not currently recognized or regulated by the Italian state. This list includes dukedoms in Italy which were created by sovereign rulers other than the King of Italy, such as the Holy Roman Emperor and the Holy See, as well as titles that originally belonged to the sovereigns of self-governing territories, such as the Duchy of Ferrara. It does not include Italian geographical titles created by French or Spanish rulers in the nobilities of their respective nations.

Sovereign Grand dukes and Dukes (as of 1860)

Royal dukes

Non-royal dukes

References

Lists of dukes
Italy dukes
Lists of peerages